Progress is a rural locality (a khutor) in Tlyaumbetovsky Selsoviet, Kugarchinsky District, Bashkortostan, Russia. The population was 11 as of 2010. There are 2 streets.

Geography 
Progress is located 41 km southwest of Mrakovo (the district's administrative centre) by road. Tavakanovo is the nearest rural locality.

References 

Rural localities in Kugarchinsky District